Clas Larsson Fleming (March 1592 – 27 July 1644) was an admiral and administrator involved in the development of a formal management structure for the Royal Swedish Navy under King Gustav II Adolf and Queen Christina. He is remembered as one of the ablest administrators in the history of the Swedish navy, and is in many ways a typical example of the type of aristocrat who served the Swedish Crown during the period of Sweden's imperial expansion.

Biography
He was the son of Lars Hermansson Fleming, the governor of Åbo in present-day Finland. He was born at Villnäs in Finland and began his military career in the army, as a cornet in the Field Marshal's Guards Company. In 1620 he began his naval service as a vice admiral and rear admiral, and served as the commander of a number of squadrons and fleets in the following years. He was away from Sweden with the navy for most of the campaigning seasons in the 1620s, but returned to Stockholm in the winters. Admirals were also administrative officers, and Fleming became a central figure in the administration of naval procurement. When the office of holmamiral, the official responsible for managing the state dockyard and arsenal in Stockholm, fell open in 1625, it was not filled for six years, but Fleming essentially fulfilled the duties of the office. During this period the dockyard was not under direct Crown control but was leased by private entrepreneurs, Henrik Hybertsson and Arendt de Groote. They built the large warship Vasa, which sank on its maiden voyage on 10 August 1628. Fleming had been involved in the negotiations of the original contract and in maintaining Crown control over the entrepreneurs, and was present at a demonstration of the ship's lack of stability about a month before the ship sailed.

In the 1630s, Fleming went to sea less and took on a variety of civil administrative tasks. He presided over the Crown's accounting office and was a member of the Royal Council. From 1634 until his death he was the first governor-general of Stockholm, an office created under the Form of Government instituted in that year. As part of his duties he was involved in the planning of the city of Stockholm and the moving of the navy's dockyard from its original home on what is now Blasieholmen to the island of Skeppsholmen, which remained the main Stockholm naval base until the later 20th century. He was instrumental in organizing the expedition to establish the Swedish colony in North America, New Sweden, in modern Delaware, in 1637.

He was also an industrialist, and in the 1630s established an ironworks at Vira, which produced weaponry for the Swedish armies in the Thirty Years War. The ironworks still exists, as a museum of 17th-century technology.

He returned to a major sea command in 1644, during the Torstenson War with Denmark-Norway. He commanded the ships sent to attack the Danish fleet and land troops on the southern Danish coast, and on 1 July, directed the Swedish forces in the Battle of Kolberger Heide, in which the Danish fleet prevented the Swedish landing. He was killed in action several weeks later, on 27 July 1644, on board his flagship, Scepter, near Kiel.

Personal life
Son of Lars Hermansson Fleming & Anna Henriksdotter Horn af Kanckas. Grandson of Admiral Herman Persson Fleming (ca. 1520–1583) and Governor-General
Henrik Klasson Horn (c.1512–1595). Married to Anna Göransdotter Snakenborg. Father of Admiral Herman Claesson Fleming af Liebelitz (1619–1673) and
Lars Claesson Fleming af Liebelitz (1621–1699) who served as Chamberlain for Christina, Queen of Sweden.

Gallery

See also
Fleming of Louhisaari

References

Other sources
 Cederlund, Carl Olof (2006) Vasa I, The Archaeology of a Swedish Warship of 1628, series editor: Fred Hocker 
 Zettersten, Axel (1890) Svenska Flottans Historia Åren 1522–1634. Stockholm.

External links

1592 births
1644 deaths
17th-century Finnish people
17th-century Swedish military personnel
People from Masku
Swedish admirals
Scandinavian explorers of North America